So Many Ways to Begin is British author Jon McGregor's second novel, first published in 2006. It was longlisted for the 2006 Booker Prize.

See also

2006 in literature
If Nobody Speaks of Remarkable Things

2006 British novels
Bloomsbury Publishing books
Novels by Jon McGregor